Manuel Kuttin (born 17 December 1993) is an Austrian professional footballer who plays as a goalkeeper. He most recently played for Grasshopper Club Zürich in the Swiss Super League.

Club statistics

References

External links
 
 Manuel Kuttin at ÖFB

1993 births
Living people
People from Spittal an der Drau
Footballers from Carinthia (state)
Austrian footballers
Association football goalkeepers
FC Admira Wacker Mödling players
Wolfsberger AC players
Grasshopper Club Zürich players
Austrian Football Bundesliga players
Austrian Regionalliga players
Austrian expatriate footballers
Expatriate footballers in Switzerland
Austrian expatriate sportspeople in Switzerland